Mexico is the second-largest Spanish-speaking music market in the world, slightly behind Spain, based on retail value. Although long plagued by piracy, the domestic market has strengthened in recent years due to strong growth from digital and streaming services, which account for 66% of the overall value, according to the International Federation of the Phonographic Industry. The following list covers the top-selling albums released in the country based on figures compiled by the Mexican Association of Producers of Phonograms and Videograms, better known as AMPROFON by its initials in Spanish, from 1999 onwards.

Best-selling albums by AMPROFON (1999 to present)
(Top albums based on certifications awarded since January 1, 1999).

By claimed sales 

*Positions based on claimed sales and release year.

The following is a list of albums that came out before the advent of AMPROFON online certifications program started in 1999 and which recorded higher sales of over 800,000 copies. Additions are cross-referenced with national publications and other media international outlets.

The best-selling album in Mexico vary by some report estimations but lacks of reliability. This include Las Mañanitas by Pedro Infante, which Mexico City-based newspaper El Universal reported sales of 20 million copies, Juan Gabriel's Recuerdos II with 8 million claimed sales, or Emmanuel's Íntimamente and José José' Secretos with claimed sales of 5 million each.

Luis Miguel has numerous entries and broke all-time Mexican records of the fastest-selling albums as well.

See also 
 AMPROFON
 Top 100 Mexico
 List of best-selling albums by country

References 

Mexico
Mexican music
Mexican music-related lists